Veiviržėnai is a small town in Klaipėda County, in northwestern Lithuania. According to the 2011 census, the town has a population of 840 people.

History
In September 1941, 300-400 Jewish women and children were murdered in Veiviržėnai by Germans and Lithuanian collaborators. The Jewish men were already murdered in July 1941, women were kept in the summer in forced labor for local farmers. The priest helped by the mayor tried to stop the massacre but were unsuccessful in stopping the massacre.

References

Towns in Lithuania
Towns in Klaipėda County
Rossiyensky Uyezd
Holocaust locations in Lithuania